Mitrovac (Serbian Cyrillic: Митровац) is a village located on the Tara Mountain, in the Bajina Bašta municipality.  The village has a recreation centre, and is home to several hotel facilities, esp. for young students.

See also 
Mitrovac

Bajina Bašta
Populated places in Zlatibor District